Christian Schilling (11 October 1879 – 14 July 1955) was a German international footballer.

References

1879 births
1955 deaths
Association football forwards
German footballers
Germany international footballers